Pereto is a comune and town in the province of L'Aquila in the Abruzzo region of Italy.

It was an ancient centre of the Marsi.

Main sights
Medieval castle, with its 13th-century imposing towers, which belonged to the Colonna family from the late 15th century.
Sanctuary of Madonna dei Bisognosi: According to the local tradition, it was erected in 608 AD. It houses some notable late-15th-century frescoes and a Crucifix carried here by Pope Boniface IV for the church's consecration.

Outside the hamlet is the Church of Santa Maria in Cellis (1132).

References

 
Marsica